The 2019–20 National Basketball League (Czech Republic) season was the 27th season of the Czech NBL. ERA Nymburk achieved their 17th consecutive title after the league ended prematurely on 18 March 2020 due to the COVID-19 pandemic.

Format
Teams in regular season play home and away against every other team in a round-robin tournament, before being split into two groups of six teams for playing again home and away against the teams from the same group.

After the end of the stage after the first split, the six teams from to top group and the two first qualified teams from the bottom group joined the play-offs.

The other four teams would play again home and away against themselves for avoiding the relegation.

Teams

Regular season

League table

Results

Group A1

League table

Results

Group A2

League table

Results

Czech clubs in European competitions

Czech clubs in international competitions

Notes

References

External links
NBL official website 

Czech Republic
Basketball
National Basketball League (Czech Republic)